The Wellington Harbour Board was constituted by act of parliament which took effect on 1 January 1880. Shipowners, those paying harbour dues, Wellington City, Hutt County, Wairarapa County, and Wellington's Chamber of Commerce all elected representatives to the board. The Mayor of Wellington was a member as was one further direct government appointment.

In October 1988 obliged by central government's unexpected resort to the High Court the business of the port was taken over from the Board by a conventional commercial enterprise, also named Port of Wellington Limited. The Lambton Harbour Project begun in 1985 hiving off and developing the Board's waterfront property in conjunction with the Wellington City Council and the Board's own self-corporatisation in mid-1987 were made obsolete.

The Board's own decisions had been overtaken by the central government's restructuring of its own and local government activities. For ports these were set out in the Ports Reform Act of April 1988 and they were given effect in Wellington the following October.

After realising its substantial remaining assets accumulated over almost 110 years the proceeds were divided between the district councils now representing Wellington, Hutt, Wairarapa and Manawatu and the Wellington Harbour Board's life ended through the 1989 local government reforms on 31 October of that year.

Establishment
The new board was given the right to levy dues on goods passing through the port but no assets. At the time the Harbourmaster and Pilots were government employees. The City Council owned Queens Wharf and its bond store. There was a new wharf and reclamation but it belonged to New Zealand Railways.

Redevelopment of the coastline

Chairmen of Wellington Harbour Board
The following is a complete list of Chairmen of Wellington Harbour Board.

See also 
 Wellington Harbour Board Head Office and Bond Store
 Wellington Harbour Board Wharf Office Building

References

 
Wellington Harbour
Port authorities in New Zealand
Companies based in Wellington
Transport in Wellington
Buildings and structures in Wellington
Transport companies of New Zealand
1880 establishments in New Zealand
1989 disestablishments in New Zealand
Buildings and structures in Wellington City